"A Song of Peace: A Patriotic Song", also known by its incipit, "This is my song", is a poem written by Lloyd Stone (1912–1993). Lloyd Stone's words were set to the Finlandia hymn melody composed by Jean Sibelius in an a cappella arrangement by Ira B. Wilson that was published by the Lorenz Publishing Company in 1934.

Alternative versions 

It often appears in hymnals with substituted and additional verses by Georgia Harkness (1891–1974).

Joan Baez has performed Finlandia at her concerts, with lyrics credited to her based on the text of This is my song by Lloyd Stone. She also featured Finlandia Hymn on her 2005 live album Bowery Songs and a live performance of the song by Baez also appeared on the album Mitä vapaus on, a compilation of protest songs by various artists, released by Amnesty.

Notes

External links

Performance of "This Is My Song" by the Boston Children's Chorus from the Isabella Stewart Gardner Museum in MP3 format
Rehearsal copy
Collection of various recordings of This is my song

1934 songs
American Christian hymns